Donald Davidson may refer to:

Donald Davidson (cricketer) (1904–1985), South African cricketer
Donald Davidson (historian), historian of the Indianapolis Motor Speedway
Donald Davidson (philosopher) (1917–2003), American philosopher
Donald Davidson (poet) (1893–1968), American poet and spokesman for the South